Luis Pablo Pozzuto (born in Argentina) is an Argentinean retired footballer who now works as head coach of Kuala Lumpur Youth Soccer in Malaysia.

Career

Pozzuto started his senior career with Club Social y Deportivo Yupanqui, Club Atletico San Lorenzo (Youth), he played for Deportivo Laferrere, Club Deportivo Moron,  Club Almirante Brown, and Club Atlético Nueva Chicago. In 1994, he signed for Deportivo Mandiyú in the Argentine Primera División, where he made twenty-four appearances and scored six goals. He played as well in Estudiante de Merida, Dundee United (short Term), Kelantan FC, Penang FC. He score aprox 100 goals in his career.

References

External links 
 Pozzuto: the idol of the Green who planted a flag in Malaysia
 Outside support 
 Budding footballers showing promise under Argentine coach
 Interview 
 En Una Baldosa Profile

Year of birth missing (living people)
Living people
Argentine footballers
Association football forwards
Association football midfielders